Corneliano d'Alba is a comune (municipality) in the Province of Cuneo in the Italian region Piedmont, located about  southeast of Turin and about  northeast of Cuneo.

Corneliano d'Alba borders the following municipalities: Alba, Baldissero d'Alba, Guarene, Montaldo Roero, Monticello d'Alba, Piobesi d'Alba, Sommariva Perno, and Vezza d'Alba.

Demographic evolution

References

Cities and towns in Piedmont
Roero